The 2000 Milan–San Remo was the 91st edition of the monument classic Milan–San Remo bicycle race and was won by Erik Zabel of Team Telekom.

Results
Source:

References

2000
March 2000 sports events in Europe
2000 in road cycling
2000 in Italian sport
Milan-San Remo